Monnett Memorial M. E. Chapel (Monnett Chapel) is a historic church at 999 OH 98 in Bucyrus, Ohio.

It was built in 1901 and added to the National Register of Historic Places in 1986.

History

The congregation traces its history back to 1828, when Issac Monnett held services in his own home.  The original chapel was built in 1849 by Jeremiah Monnett, a relative of Mary Monnett Bain.  It had between 12 and 17 members during the 1890s.  That number dropped to 6 in the year prior to the completion of the new chapel.

Construction on the new building was begun in 1902.  Its main floor seating capacity was 300, and featured an organ-loft.  It was built of blue limestone and the pulpit was oak. The new, heated chapel was dedicated August 28, 1904 and featured a "Sunday School Room".  The cost for structure was $8,500, much of the cost was funded by a gift from the late Placidia Shaw, a granddaughter of Jeremiah Monnett.  By 1908, its membership had grown to 53.

References

Methodist churches in Ohio
Churches on the National Register of Historic Places in Ohio
Churches completed in 1901
20th-century churches in the United States
Buildings and structures in Crawford County, Ohio
National Register of Historic Places in Crawford County, Ohio
Frank Packard buildings